Mount Elliot is a semi-rural locality of the Central Coast region of New South Wales, Australia,  east-north-east of Gosford's central business district. It is part of the  local government area.

Suburbs of the Central Coast (New South Wales)